Santada is a village in Achham District in the Seti Zone of western Nepal. The 1991 Nepal census estimated the village to have a population of 1,980 residents in 382 houses. The 2001 Nepal census estimated a population of 2,437, of which 27% was literate.

References

Populated places in Achham District
Village development committees in Achham District